Jonathan Davidsson (born 12 March 1997) is a Swedish professional ice hockey forward for Tappara of the Liiga. Davidsson was drafted in the sixth round, 170th overall, of the 2017 NHL Entry Draft by the Columbus Blue Jackets and traded to the Ottawa Senators in February 2019.

Playing career
Davidsson made his Swedish Hockey League debut playing with Djurgårdens IF Hockey during the 2015–16 SHL season. Davidsson also played for HockeyAllsvenskan team Asplöven HC on loan during the 2015–16 season. Jonathan's younger brother Marcus played together with Jonathan for Djurgårdens IF. Davidsson, along with his younger brother, extended his contract with Djurgården for an additional season in February 2018.

On 5 May 2018, Davidsson signed a three-year, entry-level contract with the Columbus Blue Jackets. After attending the Blue Jackets 2018 training camp, Davidsson was loaned by the Blue Jackets to return to Sweden and continue his development with Djurgårdens IF for the duration of the 2018–19 season.

On 22 February 2019, Davidsson was traded to the Ottawa Senators as part of the Blue Jackets acquisition of Senators forward Matt Duchene. Davidsson played his first game in the NHL on 7 November 2019, against the Los Angeles Kings.

After two seasons within the Senators organization, Davidsson as an impending restricted free agent opted to return to Sweden, signing a one-year contract along with his brother Marcus, to play with HV71 on 22 June 2021.

After helping HV71 return to the SHL, Davidsson registered 2 points through 23 games in the 2022–23 season before he left the club, alongside Marcus in signing for the remainder of the season with Tappara of the Finnish Liiga on 18 December 2022.

Career statistics

Regular season and playoffs

International

References

External links
 

1997 births
Asplöven HC players
Belleville Senators players
Columbus Blue Jackets draft picks
Djurgårdens IF Hockey players
HV71 players
Living people
Ottawa Senators players
Ice hockey people from Stockholm
Swedish ice hockey right wingers
Tappara players
Västerviks IK players